Memphis rap, also known as Memphis hip hop or Memphis horrorcore, is a regional subgenre of hip hop music that originated in Memphis, Tennessee in the mid-late 1980s.

Aesthetic 
It has been characterized as being low budget, using repetitive vocal hooks and a "distorted", lo-fi soundscape that utilizes the Roland TR-808 drum machine and minimal synth melodies. The genre commonly features double time flows with triplet flows, and routinely uses samples ranging from soul and funk to horror film scores and classical music, as well as hooks from songs by related rappers in the same genre, although DIY production without sampling is common as well. Because of the lack of resources, bedroom studios were often pushed to the extreme. Usually, the lyrics are quite dark and depict graphic subject matter.

DJ Spanish Fly had introduced the synthetic drum-kit sound with the TR-808, splitting the Memphis scene in two between those who preferred the live versus the digital sound. Alongside a strong drum beat were, "cowbell, syncopated rhythms, powerful sub-bass, and sharp digital snares", these elements becoming the hallmarks of the Memphis rap sound. Looping is also a signature with no steadfast rule, although looping is used over chopped edits.

Memphis artists released recordings on independent labels. The dominance of New York and Los Angeles's hip hop scenes forced southern artists to form an underground style and sound to compete with the other regions. Artists used a grassroots approach through word-of-mouth in the club scene and mixtapes to promote their music.

Artists 
DJ Spanish Fly is commonly cited as one of the pioneers of the genre, being the bridge between 1980s electro-funk and the heavier gangster rap of the following decade.

Other early artists and groups associated with Memphis rap include T-Rock, C-Rock, Gangsta Pat, La Chat, Skimask Troopaz, Gimisum Family, Project Pat, Tommy Wright III, Princess Loko, Baby OG, II Tone,  DJ Squeeky, DJ Zirk, DJ Sound, Blackout, Playa Fly, Gangsta Boo, Al Kapone, Mental Ward Click,MC Mack, Lil Noid, 8Ball & MJG and Three 6 Mafia, with the latter two achieving relative commercial success. Three 6 Mafia's Mystic Stylez and other releases by members of the group such as Come with Me 2 Hell by DJ Paul and Lord Infamous and Lil Noid's Paranoid Funk were particularly influential in the genre's development.

Influence and modern sound
Despite largely staying underground, it has attained a cult following on the internet from MP3 blogs, influencing rappers such as Lil Ugly Mane, Freddie Dredd,  Denzel Curry, and SpaceGhostPurrp, and has seen a large boom in popularity though other artists including the Suicideboys and other artists under the G59 record label. It has also brought in the rise of crunk, trap music, and phonk.

See also
 Music of Tennessee
 Southern hip hop

References

External links 
 Memphis Rap Music and Artists

1990s in American music
American hip hop genres
Culture of Memphis, Tennessee
Music of Tennessee
Music scenes
Southern hip hop
American hip hop scenes